Flower of Night is a 1925 American silent drama film directed by Paul Bern. Famous Players-Lasky produced the film with Paramount Pictures releasing. Joseph Hergesheimer provided an original story for the screen.

Plot
As described in a film magazine review, Don Giraldo y Villalon and his daughter Carlota, high caste Spaniards living in California at the time of the gold rush, are dispossessed of most of their land holdings, including the Flor de Noche mine in the hills above their hacienda. John Basset has come from the East to assist the superintendent of the mine. He stops at the hacienda to learn the way to the mine, and, at sight of him, Carlota loves him. She accepts an invitation to a miners’ dance, to which she goes only that she may see Basset again. Basset, disgusted with the revel, ignores her. When she returns home and tells her father she has disgraced herself and the family name he commits suicide. Carlota goes to San Francisco and becomes a dance hall entertainer. She meets Luke Rand, leader of the Vigilantes, and makes love to him in an effort to win Basset, who scorns her. Rand tries to confiscate the Flor de Noche mine to win Carlota. Basset in defending the mine is wounded and Carlota, altering her mind, helps him escape. Rand overtakes them, and in the fight that ensues Basset kills him. The love note is the loudest one as the story ends.

Cast

Preservation
With no prints of Flower of Night located in any film archives, it is a lost film.

References

External links

1925 films
American silent feature films
Lost American films
Films based on short fiction
Paramount Pictures films
1925 drama films
Silent American drama films
American black-and-white films
Lost drama films
1925 lost films
1920s American films